This is a list of the oldest people by country and in selected territories. It includes the individual(s) for each given country or territory who are not reported to have had the longest lifespan. Such records can only be determined to the extent that the given country's records are reliable. Comprehensive birth registration is largely a 20th-century phenomenon, so records establishing human longevity are necessarily fragmentary. The earliest comprehensive recordkeeping systems arose in Western Europe. For example, the United Kingdom organized a central recordkeeping system for England and Wales in 1837, making it compulsory by 1874.

The list of oldest people is heavily skewed toward Western countries; this is not necessarily simply due to better chances of survival. Additionally, the proportion of the world population from current developed nations was far higher over a century ago than today; the table of nations below represents less than 20% of the current global population, and the European-descended population alone constituted some 36% of the world population in 1900. Similarly, Japan continues to drop in world population rankings.

Oldest ever 
This list comprises longest-lived individuals who were born and are living or died in each country. Where known, records for both males and females are noted, as are those born in one country who emigrated to another. Multiple entries for a given country and sex indicate that the oldest person is disputed.

Territorial and overseas regions recordholders 
Below is a list of oldest people in the territories of selected countries.

Oldest living by country
This is a  list of the oldest living people by country and lists the oldest people confirmed to be alive in the past year, sorted by country. Those born in one country, but who later moved to another are specifically noted.

Independent states

Dependent territories

Notes

References

 
Lists of supercentenarians
 Oldest people